The Mahardah Dam, also spelled Mhardeh Dam, is an embankment dam on the Orontes River in the city of Mahardah, Hama Governorate, Syria. It was completed in 1960 with the primary purpose of irrigation. It was constructed by the Bulgarian firm Hydrostroy along with the al-Rastan Dam, upstream and also on the Orontes.

References

Dams in Syria
Dams completed in 1960
Al-Ghab Plain